Ante Pavelić (19 May 1869 – 11 February 1938) was a Croatian and Yugoslav dentist and politician.

Starting in 1906 he was a member of the Croatian Parliament from the Party of Rights.

On 2–3 March 1918, Pavelić chaired a conference that produced the Zagreb Resolution. On 5 October 1918, he also presided over the initial session of the National Assembly of the State of Slovenes, Croats and Serbs. On 19 October, he became the vice president of the National Assembly. Pavelić authored the Croatian Parliament's declaration of 29 October 1918, that formally acknowledged the National Assembly as the superior authority over Croatia.

Pavelić and others started negotiating with the Serbian envoy to the National Assembly Dušan T. Simović as soon as Hungary signed a truce with the Allies on 13 October 1918. Simović had said that their military victory and the treaty with Hungary gave them right to most of the territory of the State of Slovenes, Croats and Serbs, whereas Pavelić said that they want unification with Serbia, but that they needed a federal state as well as a delineation of Croatian and Serbian population that would assume a population transfer. Simović rejected the talk of federalization and Pavelić yielded, and there was no further discussion on either issue.

As a delegate of the Assembly, he read the statement on uniting the State of Slovenes, Croats and Serbs with the Kingdom of Serbia into the Kingdom of Serbs, Croats and Slovenes on 1 December 1918.

Later, Pavelić joined the Democratic Party, and in 1932 he became the Speaker of the Senate of the Kingdom of Yugoslavia.

References

External links
 

1869 births
1938 deaths
People from Gospić
People from the Kingdom of Croatia-Slavonia
Party of Rights politicians
Democratic Party (Yugoslavia) politicians
Representatives in the Croatian Parliament (1848–1918)
Representatives in the Yugoslav National Assembly (1921–1941)
Croatian dentists
Burials at Mirogoj Cemetery